Discipline is any training intended to produce a specific character or pattern of behaviour.

Discipline may also refer to:

General 
 Discipline (academia), a specific branch of knowledge, learning and practice, such as an academic or professional discipline
 Discipline (BDSM), an element of BDSM
 Disciplinary procedures, censure under rules of assembly
 Punishment, an imposition of something negative on a person or animal in response to behavior deemed wrong

Christianity 
 Book of Discipline (disambiguation), a text containing canon law, doctrine and rituals in a Christian denomination, particularly those in the Methodist tradition
 Church discipline, a response of an ecclesiastical body to an offence against its standards of belief or conduct committed by a member of that body
 Discipline (mortification), a type of scourge used in the Christian spiritual discipline known as the mortification of the flesh

Music 
 Discipline (band), an independent rock band from Detroit
 The Disciplines, a Norwegian garage-rock band
 Discipline, the name of a mid-1981 line-up of King Crimson
 Discipline GM, an independent record label founded by Robert Fripp

Albums 
 Discipline (Cadaver Inc. album)
 Discipline (Desmond Child album)
 Discipline (Janet Jackson album)
 Discipline (King Crimson album)
 Discipline (Kompressor album)

Songs 
 "Discipline" (instrumental), by King Crimson
 "Discipline" (Nine Inch Nails song)
 "Discipline" (Throbbing Gristle song)
 "Discipline", a song by Cadaver Inc. from their album of the same name
 "Discipline", a song by Desmond Child from his album of the same name
 "Discipline", a song by Gang Starr from Full Clip: A Decade of Gang Starr
 "Discipline", a song by Janet Jackson from her album of the same name
 "Discipline", a song by Orelsan from La fête est finie - Épilogue

Other media 
 Discipline (novel), by Mary Brunton

See also 
 Disciple (disambiguation)
 List of academic disciplines
 Self control, an ability to control one's emotions, behavior and desires in order to obtain some reward later